Georgia Clarke (born 23 June 2000) is an Australian rules footballer who played for the Geelong Football Club in the AFL Women's (AFLW).

Clarke was drafted with selection number 24 in the 2018 AFL Women's draft, and made her AFLW debut during the second round of the 2019 season, kicking a goal also while playing in the backline, against Western Bulldogs at Whitten Oval.

In March 2023, Clarke was delisted by Geelong.

Clarke currently studies a Bachelor of Health Sciences at Deakin University.

References

External links 

Geelong Football Club (AFLW) players
2000 births
Living people
Australian rules footballers from Victoria (Australia)
Sportswomen from Victoria (Australia)
Greater Western Victoria Rebels players (NAB League Girls)